CDW is an American technology corporation.

CDW may also refer to:

CDW Building, Tsuen Wan, Hong Kong, China
Charge density wave, in quantum physics
Collision damage waiver, car rental insurance
Congregation for Divine Worship, a former name of the Dicastery for Divine Worship and the Discipline of the Sacraments
Essex County Airport, New Jersey, U.S. (by IATA code)
Civil danger warning, a specific area message encoding code in the United States

See also